Pablo Ganet Comitre (born 4 November 1994) is a professional footballer who plays as a midfielder for Segunda División RFEF club Real Murcia. Born in Spain, he represents the Equatorial Guinea national team.

Club career
Born in Málaga, Andalusia, Ganet graduated from Real Betis' youth setup. In the 2013 summer he joined Málaga CF's reserve team, and made his senior debuts for the latter in the Tercera División.

On 20 August 2014, Ganet joined UD San Sebastián de los Reyes, also in the fourth level.

International career
After being eligible through his father, Ganet was included in Esteban Becker's 23-man Equatoguinean squad for the 2015 Africa Cup of Nations on 4 January 2015. Three days later he made his full international debut, coming on as a second half substitute in a 1–1 friendly draw against Cape Verde.

Career statistics

Scores and results list Equatorial Guinea's goal tally first.

Honours
Ittihad Tanger
Botola: 2017–18

References

External links

1994 births
Living people
Citizens of Equatorial Guinea through descent
Equatoguinean footballers
Association football midfielders
Ittihad Tanger players
Kazma SC players
Saham SC players
Botola players
Kuwait Premier League players
Equatorial Guinea international footballers
2015 Africa Cup of Nations players
2021 Africa Cup of Nations players
People of Bubi descent
Equatoguinean sportspeople of Spanish descent
Equatoguinean expatriate footballers
Equatoguinean expatriate sportspeople in Morocco
Expatriate footballers in Morocco
Equatoguinean expatriate sportspeople in Kuwait
Expatriate footballers in Kuwait
Equatoguinean expatriate sportspeople in Oman
Expatriate footballers in Oman
Footballers from Málaga
Spanish footballers
Atlético Malagueño players
UD San Sebastián de los Reyes players
Arroyo CP players
Algeciras CF footballers
CD San Roque de Lepe footballers
Tercera División players
Segunda División B players
Spanish sportspeople of Equatoguinean descent
Spanish people of Bubi descent
Spanish expatriate footballers
Spanish expatriate sportspeople in Morocco
Spanish expatriate sportspeople in Kuwait
Spanish expatriate sportspeople in Oman